Justin Jason Athanaze (born  29 January 1988) is a cricketer who has played for the Leeward Islands cricket team in West Indian domestic competitions. As of December 2018, he has played 25 first-class, 36 List A and 21 T20 cricket matches, having made making his debut in January 2007.

Athanaze was born in Antigua and played for Antigua Hawksbills in the 2014 Caribbean Premier League. In October 2019, he was named in the Leeward Islands' squad for the 2019–20 Regional Super50 tournament.

References 

1988 births
Leeward Islands cricketers
Living people
Antigua and Barbuda cricketers
St Kitts and Nevis Patriots cricketers
Antigua Hawksbills cricketers